Jose Tlatelpas (born 1953 in Mexico City) is a Mexican poet, essayist, visual artist, journalist, publisher, writer and political activist for civil rights. He lives in Mexico City and Vancouver, British Columbia. He has been a director of several cultural and political magazines since 1972, such as Nueva Generación (1972), Gaceta Politécnica de Literatura y Redacción (1981), La Guirnalda Polar (since 1996) and Poder Popular (since 2008).

Among other places, he gave workshops for the INBA (National Institute of Fine Arts and Literature) in Mexico, the ENEP Acatlan University; abroad, he conducted workshops in CLAVES Latinoamericanas and the Circulo de Escritores Latinoamericanos in Vancouver,  Canada, and other places.

In 1985, he was a coordinator of Maiz Rebelde, the Cultural Group of The Movimiento Revolucionario del Pueblo (MRP), incorporated into the Mexican Socialist Party (Partido Mexicano Socialista PMS), a party that evolved into the Partido de la Revolución Democrática or PRD) and finally to Morena. The Maiz Rebelde group was founded with the poet Mario Ramírez, muralist José Hernández Delgadillo, the poet Benito Balam and others. Among many other works, they published "Desde los Siglos del Maiz Rebelde" (1987), a poetry anthology with an introduction by Horacio Caballero.

Poetry
English:
 Canadian panorama, The Coyote Sen Klip Recordings, audiobook, music by America Mestiza, Xavier Quijas,  and Susane Morgan, English, Vancouver, 1991.
 Sprouting from the Light, collective, poetry, Neoclassic E Press, Vancouver, English, Canada, 1991.

Spanish:

 Miriam Barrios o La Huilotita Mañanera, Ediciones del Coyote Esquivo, Spanish, Mexico, 1979.
 El Chalchihuite de Tlatepas, Sawarabi Supansha, Spanish, Kyoto, 1981.
 Poemas desde el Piso o INBATextos a las poetisas fermosas, Ediciones del Coyote Esquivo, Spanish, Mexico, 1985.

El libro Rojo del 68, by Mario Ramírez, Leopoldo Ayala and José Tlatelpas, a virtual version of the book commemorating the 40th anniversary of the student genocide in Tlatelolco, Mexico Canada, Spanish, 2008.
 Coro de llamas para el Che, collective of poetry about Che Guevara, published by Editorial Cibertaria, Spanish, Mexico, 2008.

Visual arts
Some artwork by José Tlatelpas in the Abibi Art Gallery at Bluecanvas.

References

 Essay by J Tlatelpas about Nahuatl literature and Angel Ma Garibay K. Spanish, Canada, 1996.
 Blog about José Tlatelpas, Spanish

External links
 La Guirnalda Polar, Hispanic culture webzine, Vancouver, Spanish, Canada.
 Detailed bibliography and bio of José Tlatelpas, English, compiled by Nahún Sánchez at Knol.
 La Suave Patria, J. Tlatelpas reads a poem by Ramón López Velarde, Tezcatlipoca Cultural, Spanish, podcast, 2021 
 El Libro rojo del 68, El Libro rojo del 68, (The 68’s Red Book), poetry anthology, webzine La Guirnalda Polar, 2012.
 Photography of the Suave Patria, (a poem by Ramón López Velarde), video with photos by Jorge Vargas, voice by J. Tlatelpas, 2020.
 Tribute to Xavier Quijas, video about the Native musician, and Mexican culture elder, 2021
 Bio about Jose Tlatelpas, in the Enciclopedia of the Mexican literature.
 Canadian Panorama, poetry by Jose Tlatelpas, English, Canada, 1991.
 Visual art by J. Tlatelpas, Sumi-e, acrylics and digital art by Jose Tlatelpas, English, Canada, 1991.
 Lunita Caraveo, article and prologue for a book by J. Tlatelpas, by Juan Cervera, Spanish, 2013.
 APUNTES SOBRE ANGEL MA. GARIBAY K. Y SU PAPEL COMO HISTORIADOR Y TRADUCTOR DE LITERATURA NAHUATL, article ands research about Mexican Native literature and Angel M. Garibay, Spanish.

1953 births
Living people
Mexican male poets
Mexican male writers
Mexican essayists
Male essayists
People from Mexico City